UFC on ESPN: Holloway vs. Allen (also known as UFC on ESPN 44) is an upcoming mixed martial arts event produced by the Ultimate Fighting Championship that will take place on April 15, 2023, at the T-Mobile Center in Kansas City, Missouri, United States.

Background
The event will mark the promotion's second visit to Kansas City and first since UFC on Fox: Johnson vs. Reis in April 2017.

A featherweight bout between former UFC Featherweight Champion Max Holloway and Arnold Allen is expected to headline the event.

A bantamweight bout between Danaa Batgerel and Brady Hiestand was scheduled for the event. However, the pair was moved to UFC Fight Night: Pavlovich vs. Blaydes a week later for undisclosed reasons.

Fight card

Announced bouts 
Heavyweight bout: Martin Buday vs. Jake Collier

See also 

 List of UFC events
 List of current UFC fighters
 2023 in UFC

References 

 

UFC on ESPN
2023 in mixed martial arts
Scheduled mixed martial arts events
2023 in sports in Missouri
April 2023 sports events in the United States